Mary Young Hunter or Young-Hunter (1872 – 1947) was a New Zealand painter.

Biography
Hunter was born in Napier and married John Young-Hunter. She exhibited with the Royal Academy from 1900.

She had a daughter, Gabrielle Young-Hunter, who married Edward G. Kuster in Germany in 1928.

Works
Her works were included in the book Women Painters of the World. 

 Joy and the Labourer
 Olivia
 Where Shall Wisdom be Found?

Death
Hunter died in Monterey, California on September 8, 1947.

Gallery

References

 

1872 births
1947 deaths
People from Napier, New Zealand
New Zealand women painters
19th-century New Zealand painters
20th-century New Zealand painters
19th-century New Zealand women artists
20th-century New Zealand women artists